The Southern Rhodesia Act 1965 c. 76 was an Act of the Parliament of the United Kingdom. It was designed to reaffirm British legal rule in Southern Rhodesia after Rhodesia had unilaterally declared independence. In practice, it only enforced the status of Southern Rhodesia as a British colony in British constitutional theory as the Rhodesian government did not recognise it.

History 

On 11 November 1965, the Prime Minister of Southern Rhodesia Ian Smith declared Rhodesia's Unilateral Declaration of Independence from the British Empire after the British Government refused to grant independence with White minority rule was still in place. Within five days, the Southern Rhodesia Act 1965 had passed through Parliament and had received royal assent from Queen Elizabeth II. The Southern Rhodesia Act 1965 stated that Southern Rhodesia was still legally a British colony and affirmed to the Queen the power to govern Southern Rhodesia via Orders in Council including amending the constitution and enforce legal restrictions upon them unilaterally.

Effect 

The first use of the Act was when the Queen issued an Order-in-Council to suspend the Southern Rhodesian Constitution and legally sacked the Rhodesian Front government. This gave formal effect to Governor Sir Humphrey Gibbs dismissing the Rhodesian Front government within hours of the UDI, acting on orders from Whitehall.

The Act was intended to show that the British Government alone had authority in Southern Rhodesia in theory. However, in practice, the act was largely ignored in Rhodesia and the government continued to meet as they considered that it was in violation of the constitutional convention that Westminster did not legislate for Southern Rhodesia. Additionally, it maintained that "in view of the new [Rhodesian] constitution" adopted as an annex to the UDI, the Crown's reserve power to sack the government no longer existed.

The Rhodesian Front government initially maintained allegiance to Queen Elizabeth II. It attempted to reconstitute Rhodesia as a Commonwealth realm, recognising Elizabeth as Queen of Rhodesia. Prime Minister Ian Smith even went as far as advising the Queen to appoint a Governor-General as her representative in Rhodesia, acting on his claimed prerogatives as Her Majesty's Rhodesian Prime Minister. However, Queen Elizabeth II turned down this "purported advice." Ultimately, in 1970, Rhodesia unilaterally declared itself a republic after the Queen refused to recognise the title as legal. In 1978, when Southern Rhodesia proposed an Internal Settlement to instigate black majority rule, the United Nations rejected it. The Act was repealed by the Zimbabwe Act 1979 after Rhodesia voluntarily returned to its former status as a British colony in order for multiracial elections and internationally recognised independence as Zimbabwe.

References 

United Kingdom Acts of Parliament 1965
Southern Rhodesia
Rhodesia
1965 in Rhodesia
1980 disestablishments in Zimbabwe
1980 disestablishments in the United Kingdom
Zimbabwe and the Commonwealth of Nations